Adriatico Street is a north–south road connecting Ermita and Malate districts in Manila, Philippines. Its northern terminus is at Padre Faura Street in Ermita carrying southbound traffic all the way to Quirino Avenue in Malate. South of Quirino, the street becomes two way with a wide median running down the center from just past the Manila Zoo up to its southern terminus at Ocampo Street.

Adriatico is known primarily for its restaurants and bars centered on the area around Manila's Korea Town between Pedro Gil and San Andres Streets, considered the center of bohemian night life in the city.

The street was named in 1964 after Macario Adriatico, a Filipino parliamentarian and author of Manila's city charter. It was formerly known as Dakota Avenue, after the U.S. states of North and South Dakota, collectively known as The Dakotas.

Landmarks

 Century Park Hotel 
 Harrison Plaza (closed in 2019; demolished in 2021)
 Malate Pensionne
 Manila Zoo
 Midland Plaza Hotel
 Ninoy Aquino Stadium
 Paraiso ng Batang Maynila (Malate)
 Remedios Circle
 Rizal Memorial Stadium
 Robinsons Adriatico Residences
 Robinsons Manila
 Sheraton Manila Bay

References

Streets in Manila
Restaurant districts and streets in the Philippines
Malate, Manila
Ermita